This article contains an overview of the sport of athletics, including track and field, cross country and road running, in the year 2001.

The foremost competition of the season was the 2001 World Championships in Athletics in Edmonton, Alberta, Canada. The 2001 IAAF World Indoor Championships was the second major track and field event that year.

Major events

World

World Championships
World Cross Country Championships
World Half Marathon Championships
Grand Prix Final
World Indoor Championships
World Youth Championships
World Student Games
Goodwill Games

Regional

African Junior Championships
Asian Cross Country Championships
East Asian Games
Maccabiah Games
Southeast Asian Games
Balkan Games
European Cup
European Junior Championships
European U23 Championships
European Cross Country Championships
European Race Walking Cup
Island Games
Mediterranean Games
Bolivarian Games
CAC Championships
Central American Games
Jeux de la Francophonie
Pan American Junior Championships
South American Championships

National
China National Games
Lithuanian Athletics Championships

World records

Men

Women

Awards

Men

Women

Men's Best Year Performances

Marathon

400m Hurdles

3,000m Steeplechase

Pole Vault

Hammer Throw

Decathlon

Women's Best Year Performances

100 metres

200 metres

Half Marathon

Marathon

100m Hurdles

400m Hurdles

3,000m Steeplechase

High Jump

Pole Vault

Hammer Throw

Heptathlon

Deaths
March 31 — Diego García (39), Spanish long-distance runner (b. 1961)
August 15 — Richard Chelimo (29), Kenyan athlete (b. 1972)
October 18 — Micheline Ostermeyer (78), French athlete (b. 1922)

References
 ARRS

 
Athletics (track and field) by year